The Old Providence Church is located off New Boonesboro Road in Winchester, Clark County, Kentucky, United States.  Constructed of stone, the building was built in the late eighteenth century.

Among the members of the church was Daniel Boone, and two of his family members — Samuel and Mary — were baptized there.  Once named Howard's Creek Church, it was renamed Old Providence Church in 1790.  A "United Baptist" organization was founded at the church in 1801.  The building was passed to the Negro Baptists in 1870; it was slightly damaged in a fire and restored in 1949.

See also
 List of the oldest buildings in Kentucky

References

Baptist churches in Kentucky
National Register of Historic Places in Clark County, Kentucky
Religious organizations established in 1790
18th-century Baptist churches in the United States
Churches in Clark County, Kentucky
Churches on the National Register of Historic Places in Kentucky
1793 establishments in Kentucky
Winchester, Kentucky
African-American history of Kentucky